Robert James Anthony Harvie "Bob" Harvie was a popular announcer of Radio Ceylon. Harvie's voice was inextricably linked to cricket commentaries from the island of Ceylon. He has led the English cricket commentary team from Radio Ceylon and subsequently the Sri Lanka Broadcasting Corporation. Harvie has been a significant figure where cricket commentaries from Sri Lanka are concerned and he has been on the radio on Ceylon test matches against visiting England teams.

Bob Harvie has made his commentaries  when the Ceylon team was captained by Anura Tennekoon and Michael Tissera. Bob Harvie was Ceylon's ' John Arlott' and enjoyed huge popularity as a cricket commentator, giving his ball by ball commentaries over Radio Ceylon, alongside other great Ceylonese commentators such as Norton Pereira. He gained a war service commission as a Second Lieutenant in the Ceylon Light Infantry, he retired as a Captain in the Ceylon Volunteer Force.

The Royal-Thomian Encounter

Bob Harvie has also been on the Radio Ceylon, CBC commentary team covering the annual Royal–Thomian cricket match, the 'Battle of the Blues', the oldest unbroken Ceylonese cricket match between S. Thomas' College, Mount Lavinia and Royal College Colombo.

He was also known for covering the Kandy Perahara, Army Tattoo, Remembrance Day Parade as well as being in charge of Rugby and Boxing Commentaries over the airwaves of Radio Ceylon/Sri Lanka Broadcasting Corporation.

The Art of Commentary

Sriyani de Silva, in an obituary published in the Sunday Times in Colombo observed: 'Bob Harvie was the toast of the sports world, when it came to the art of commentary! Apart from his impeccable diction and use of the appropriate and accurate facts, names and terminology – which he was an absolute stickler for – Bob was able to bring any event vividly alive to listeners island wide, and even in the sub-continent if I remember right, in those days when TV did not exist. His almost magical word-wizardry would encapsulate in his own inimitable style, all the excitement of a crucial rugby encounter, magnificent Independence parade, nail-biting motor sports event, beauty pageant or black tie dinner-dance. I think I can safely say, the likes of him has never been matched.'

Harvie lived in Sri Lanka until his death on 7 July 2010.

See also
Radio Ceylon
Sri Lanka Broadcasting Corporation
List of Sri Lankan broadcasters
Esala Perahera

References

External links 
 Sri Lanka Cricket Official Website
  Sri Lanka Broadcasting Corporation
 SLBC-creating new waves of history
Eighty Years of Broadcasting in Sri Lanka
Reference to Bob Harvie commentating in the Bradby Shield match of 1970 – The Nation newspaper, Sri Lanka
 Bob Harvie no More, Daily Mirror – Sri Lanka
 In fond and loving memory of the late Bob Harvie – Sunday Times, Sri Lanka
 Obituary on Bob Harvie – Daily News, Sri Lanka
 Obituary on Bob Harvie in the Daily Mirror, Sri Lanka

Sri Lankan radio personalities
Sri Lankan cricket commentators
Year of birth missing
2010 deaths
Rugby union commentators
Rugby union in Sri Lanka
Ceylon Light Infantry officers
Sri Lanka Army Volunteer Force officers